The Natural History Museum of Los Angeles County is the largest natural and historical museum in the western United States. Its collections include nearly 35 million specimens and artifacts and cover 4.5 billion years of history. This large collection is comprised not only of specimens for exhibition, but also of vast research collections housed on and offsite. 

The museum is associated with two other museums in Greater Los Angeles: the Page Museum at the La Brea Tar Pits in Hancock Park and the William S. Hart Ranch and Museum in Newhall. The three museums work together to achieve their common mission: "to inspire wonder, discovery, and responsibility for our natural and cultural worlds."

History
NHM opened in Exposition Park, Los Angeles, California, United States in 1913 as The Museum of History, Science, and Art. The moving force behind it was a museum association founded in 1910. Its distinctive main building with fitted marble walls and domed and colonnaded rotunda, is on The National Register of Historic Places. Additional wings opened in 1925, 1930, 1960, and 1976.

The museum split in 1961 into The Los Angeles County Museum of History and Science and the Los Angeles County Museum of Art (LACMA). LACMA moved to new quarters on Wilshire Boulevard in 1965, and the Museum of History and Science was renamed The Los Angeles County Museum of Natural History. Eventually, the museum renamed itself again, becoming The Natural History Museum of Los Angeles County.

In 2003, the museum began a campaign to transform its exhibits and visitor experience. The museum reopened its seismically retrofitted renovated 1913 rotunda, along with the new "Age of Mammals" exhibition in 2010. Its Dinosaur Hall opened in July 2011. A new Los Angeles history exhibition, "Becoming Los Angeles", opened in 2013. The outdoor Nature Gardens and Nature Lab, which explore L.A. wildlife, also opened in 2013.

Research and collections
The museum maintains research and collections in the following fields:

 Annelida
 Anthropology and Archaeology
 Ethnology
 Crustacea
 Echinoderms
 Entomology
 Herpetology
 History
 Ichthyology
 Invertebrate paleontology
 Malacology
 Mammalogy
 Mineralogy
 Ornithology
 Vertebrate paleontology

The museum has three floors of permanent exhibits. Among the most popular museum displays are those devoted to animal habitats, dinosaurs, pre-Columbian cultures, The Ralph M. Parsons Discovery Center and Insect Zoo, and the new Nature Lab, which explores urban wildlife in Southern California.

The museum's collections are strong in many fields, but the mineralogy and Pleistocene paleontology are the most esteemed, the latter thanks to the wealth of specimens collected from The La Brea Tar Pits. 

The museum has almost 30 million specimens representing marine zoology. These include one of the largest collections of marine mammal remains in the world, housed in a warehouse off site, which at over 5,000 specimens is second in size only to that of The Smithsonian.

The museum's collection of historical documents is held in The Seaver Center for Western History Research.

Special exhibits
The museum hosts regular special exhibitions which augment its collections and advance its mission. Recent special exhibits have included Mummies and Pterosaurs.

The museum also hosts a butterfly pavilion outside every spring and summer and a spider pavilion on the same site in the fall.

Since 2017, the museum has hosted a special exhibit about P-22, the mountain lion that lived in nearby Griffith Park.

Architecture
Over the years, the museum has built additions onto its original building. Originally dedicated when The Natural History Museum opened in 1913, the rotunda is one of the museum's most elegant and popular spaces. Lined with marble columns and crowned by a stained glass dome, the room is also the home of the very first piece of public art funded by Los Angeles County, a Beaux-Arts statue by Julia Bracken Wendt entitled Three Muses, or History, Science and Art. This hall is among the most distinctive locales in Los Angeles and has often been used as a filming location.

Gallery

References

External links 

 
 William S. Hart Ranch and Museum
 George C. Page Museum at the La Brea Tar Pits
Review of the Museum's new Dinosaur Hall at The New York Times, July 19, 2011
Slide show of exhibit
One of the famous Diamonds Collection in Exhibition of L.A. COUNTY MUSEUM, Recently exhibited in Taiwan Auction House, December 6, 2020

Museums in Los Angeles
Exposition Park (Los Angeles)
Los Angeles
Archaeological museums in California
Dinosaur museums in the United States
Geology museums in California
History museums in California
Mesoamerican art museums in the United States
Mineralogy museums
Native American museums in California
Science museums in California
Science and technology in Greater Los Angeles
Botanical gardens in California
Butterfly houses
Gardens in California
Paleontology in California
Government buildings completed in 1913
Government buildings on the National Register of Historic Places in Los Angeles
Association of Science-Technology Centers member institutions
Institutions accredited by the American Alliance of Museums
Museums established in 1913
1913 establishments in California
Beaux-Arts architecture in California
Mediterranean Revival architecture in California
South Los Angeles
Native Americans in Los Angeles